The Tesechoacan River is a river of Mexico in Veracruz state.
It is formed where the Cajones River joins the Manso River, both flowing eastward from the Sierra Madre de Oaxaca and is a tributary of the Papaloapan River.

See also
List of rivers of Mexico

References

Rivers of Veracruz
Papaloapan River